The 19031/19032 Ahmedabad Rishikesh Yoga Express is an express train belonging to Indian Railways that runs between Ahmedabad and Rishikesh  in India. It is a daily service. It operates as train number 19031 from Ahmedabad to Rishikesh and as train number 19032 in the reverse direction.

Coaches

As it shares rakes with the Lok Shakti Express, it has 1 AC 1st Class cum AC 2 tier, 1 AC 2 tier, 5 AC 3 tier, 10 Sleeper class, 4 General class coaches. As with most train services in India, Coach Composition may be amended at the discretion of Indian Railways depending on demand. It also carries a Railway Mail coach thus earning it the title of "Mail" in its name when it ran as Haridwar Mail.

Service

It is a daily train & covers the distance of 1280 kilometres in 26 hours 05 mins as 19031 Yoga Express (46.31 km/hr) & 1207 kilometres 25 hours 45 mins as 19032 Yoga Express (46.87 km/hr). As its average speed is below 55 km/hr, it does not have a superfast charge on its fare.

Route and halts

The important halts of the train are:

 
 
 
 

 
 Unjha
 
 
 Pindwara
 Jawai Bandh
 Falna
 Rani railway
 
 Sojat Road
 Haripur
 Beawar
 
 Kishangarh
 
 
 Gandhi Nagar Jaipur
 Bandikui Junction
 
 Kairthal railway station
 
 Pataudi Road
 
 Delhi Cantonment
 
 Delhi Shahdara Junction
 
 Naya Ghaziabad
 Modinagar
 Meerut Cantonment
 
 Sakhoti Tanda
 khatauli
 
 Deoband
 Tapri Junction

Traction

As the route is now fully electrified, It is being hauled by a Vadodara Loco Shed based WAP-7 / Vatva Loco Shed based WAP-4 electric locomotive on its entire journey.

Schedule

19031 Ahmedabad Rishikesh Yoga Express leaves Ahmedabad every day and reaches Haridwar Junction the next day.

19032 Rishikesh Ahmedabad Yoga Express leaves Haridwar every day and reaches Ahmedabad the next day.

Gallery

See also
 List of named passenger trains of India

References

External links
Haridwar Mail Indian Railways

Trains from Haridwar
Transport in Ahmedabad
Named passenger trains of India
Rail transport in Gujarat
Rail transport in Rajasthan
Express trains in India